When I Wake Up is the third studio album by English/Irish singer Maverick Sabre. His "most personal record" to date, the album was released on 22 March 2019 on Sabre's own imprint FAMM.

Critical reception

The album has received generally positive reviews from music critics, including ABC News and London in Stereo. M. Oliver of PopMatters claimed it to be the best album by Sabre to date.

Track listing

Charts

References

2019 albums
Maverick Sabre albums